A Fellow on a Furlough is a World War II song written by Bobby Worth in 1943 and published by House of Melody.

The chorus states, "He's just a fellow on a furlough / Whose hopes have all come true / The girl of his furlough dream is you."

The song is performed by Bob Crosby in the 1944 film Meet Miss Bobby Socks.

References

Bibliography 
Holloway, Diane, and Bob Cheney. American History in Song: Lyrics from 1900 to 1945. San Jose: Authors Choice Press, 2001.  
Smith, Kathleen E. R. God Bless America: Tin Pan Alley Goes to War. Lexington, KY: University Press of Kentucky, 2003. Print.  

1943 songs
Songs of World War II
Songs written by Bobby Worth